OneSpan (formerly Vasco Data Security International, Inc.) is a publicly traded cybersecurity technology company based in Chicago, Illinois, with offices in Montreal, Brussels and Zurich. The company offers a cloud-based and open-architected anti-fraud platform and is historically known for its multi-factor authentication and electronic signature software. 

It was founded by T. Kendall Hunt in 1991 and held its initial public offering (IPO) in January 2000. OneSpan is a member of the FIDO Alliance Board.

History

In 1984, T. Kendall Hunt founded Vasco as a consulting and software services company for corporate and governmental agencies. In 1991, the company acquired ThumbScan, which claimed to have the first fingerprint reader device for a computer. 

In 1993, the company was renamed Vasco Data Security International and expanded its offerings to include data security. Vasco was incorporated in 1997 and held its initial public offering in January 2000.

Vasco started developing its Digipass technology in the early 2000s. The company marketed the technology internationally in Belgium. In 2009, Vasco announced that Digipass two-factor authentication was available in the App Store for iPhone and iPod Touch. Forbes recognized Vasco on its list of "America's Fastest-Growing Tech Companies" that year.

In January 2011, Vasco acquired DigiNotar, a Dutch certificate authority. In June 2011, DigiNotar was hacked and started issuing false security certificates. When the news broke, all issued certificates were cancelled and the company went bankrupt.

The company established its international headquarters at Dubai Silicon Oasis in 2012. Vasco announced that it would lower EMEA channel entry for VARs at that time. It became a member of the Fast IDentity Online (FIDO) Alliance in June 2014 and was later recognized by Gartner's Magic Quadrant for User Authentication.

In October 2015, Vasco acquired Silanis Technology, a Canadian document e-signature company, for US$113 million. By early 2016, the company's cloud electronic signature software, eSignLive, was updated to include integration with Salesforce. Vasco announced a face recognition authentication feature for Digipass in May 2016. The company has partnerships with financial institutions including HSBC Bank USA, Fedict, Rabobank, Arab Bank and Riyadh Bank.

OneSpan

On May 30, 2018, Vasco changed its name to OneSpan. It now trades under the ticker symbol OSPN.

In May 2018, the company acquired Dealflo, a UK and Canada-based financial agreement automation software company, for GB41 million.

Technology

 Identity Verification: validate ID documents and consumer identities via third-party identity and verification services through a single API integration
 Authentication: authenticate users and transactions using a range of multi-factor authentication services, including hardware & software tokens and biometric capabilities
 Risk Analytics: analyze mobile, app and transaction data, in real-time, to detect fraud
 Mobile App Security: detect and mitigate malicious mobile app attacks before they can do damage
 E-Signature: enable customers to e-sign on any device, while strengthening compliance

Services are delivered through OneSpan's open, cloud-based Trusted Identity (TID) platform

References

External links

Oakbrook Terrace, Illinois
Technology companies established in 1984
Computer security companies
Companies based in DuPage County, Illinois
Companies listed on the Nasdaq
1984 establishments in Illinois